, also called Prétear - The New Legend of Snow White, is a manga series written by Junichi Sato and illustrated by Kaori Naruse. Spanning four volumes, the manga series was originally published in Japan by Kadokawa Shoten from May 2000 through July 2001. It was published in English in North America by ADV Manga.

The series was adapted into a thirteen episode anime series by Hal Film Maker, Kadokawa Shoten, and Rondo Robe. It aired in Japan on WOWOW from April 4, 2001 until June 27, 2001. Geneon (now NBCUniversal Entertainment Japan) released the series episodes across four volumes in Japan in both VHS video and DVD forms. ADV Films had licensed and released the anime series.

Plot
A high school girl named Himeno Awayuki is attempting to adjust to her new life after her widowed father remarries wealthy widow Natsue. While taking a short cut to school, Himeno jumps out of a bush and lands on Hayate, the Knight of Wind. After some arguing Himeno wants to punch Hayate, but he blocks her hand causing a powerful light. Later she meets the other Leafe Knights who tell her that the red snow that has been falling on the town recently is being caused by the Princess of Disaster who is awakening, and that she is using demon larva to absorb Leafe, the essence of all life. They ask Himeno to become the Prétear and help them protect the world. Himeno is initially reluctant, believing they are trying to play a trick on her. When a larva attacks them and begins stealing leafe, Himeno agrees to help. Hayate tells her to take his hand and she merges with him to become the Wind Prétear. After adjusting to her new powers, Himeno is able to defeat the larva.

As the series progresses, Himeno finds herself slowly falling in love with Hayate, who is initially cold and refuses to acknowledge her as the Prétear. Eventually she learns the Princess of Disaster was once a girl named Takako, who was the last Prétear. She had not enjoyed fighting, but did it anyway, also falling in love with Hayate. When he could not return her feelings, her anguish caused her powers to turn to evil, changing her into the Princess of Disaster.

Mawata, one of Himeno's stepsisters, has been overwhelmed with grief since the death of her father and holds herself distant from her family. She and Himeno temporarily connect over their shared feelings, but Mawata is hurt when she sees Himeno with Hayate. Mawata is in love with Sasame, but it is revealed that he was in love with Takako. He throws away his status as a Leafe Knight and joins Takako to become her Knight of Darkness. Takako uses Mawata's love for Sasame to hurt her even more, enabling Takako to use her to fuel the Great Tree of Fenrir.

The town is overrun by the Great Tree. To protect the rest of her family, Himeno reveals her Prétear powers to them, then begs them to escape while she rescues Mawata. Instead, the family refuses to leave Mawata behind and put themselves in great physical danger to rescue her. Hayate and Sasame engage in a battle to the death, and Himeno climbs the Great Tree of Fenrir. Himeno's family starts attacking the bubble holding Mawata, calling to her desperately. Himeno continues up the tree to confront the Princess of Disaster. Mawata is freed and safe in the arms of her family. Takako doesn't want her to go and becomes desperate calling out for Sasame who appears after beating Hayate in battle. Fenrir asks Sasame to kill both Hayate and Himeno, but he is convinced by Himeno not to. Believing that not even Sasame loves her, Takako tries to kill herself, but Sasame shields her and dies. Takako comes back to her true self realizing that she loved Sasame too. Out of control, the tree captures Takako. Himeno tries to save her and she's attacked by the tree. Hayate shields her and then he dies in her arms.

To stop the tree, Himeno by herself becomes the legendary White Prétear and pours out a massive amount of Leafe. The town is restored, the Leafe Knights healed, and Sasame and Hayate are brought back to life. Hayate awakens to find the others crying over Himeno's lifeless body, lying in the grass as if she were sleeping. In agony, he holds her, then kisses her, which restores her life and enables her to awaken. At the end of the series, Himeno and Hayate are a couple, Himeno and her family are closer, Mawata is happier, and Takako is seen quietly sitting with Sasame.

Characters

Awayuki family
  is the sixteen-year-old protagonist of Prétear. After her mother's death and her father's remarriage, Himeno is thrust into a high-class society life where she has trouble adjusting as she is picked on both by her new family and her peers at school. As Himeno's alienation grows, she meets Hayate and the other Leafe Knights, who tell her that she's the Prétear who is needed to save the world. She develops feelings for Hayate and falls in love with him throughout the course of the series. She is voiced by Sayuri Yoshida in the original Japanese anime adaptation, and by Luci Christian in the English dub.

 , who is the same age as Himeno, is the eldest daughter of Natsue and holds a pretentious attitude toward Himeno for coming from an impoverished family. Mayune often plays practical jokes to demean Himeno and tattles on her to her mother. Mayune and Himeno reconcile after Himeno saves Mawata from the Great Tree of Fenrir. She is the first to break down into fits of sobs after fervently trying to awaken Himeno after her death. Mayune's voice in the anime adaptation is provided by Satsuki Yukino in the Japanese dub and by Shelley Calene-Black in the English dub.

  is fourteen years old. Intelligent and composed, Mawata is the seemingly perfect child of the family. However, her outwardly calm demeanor is used as a facade to hide her loneliness and mask her own sense of loss after her father's death. Ultimately, Mawata's grief of losing her father and heartbreak over Sasame, is used by Fenrir to fuel the Great Tree of Fenrir. She is voiced by Akemi Kanda in the original Japanese anime adaptation, and by Mandy Clark in the English dub.

  is a former author of romance novels and Himeno's father. Before marrying Natsue, Kaoru spent much of his time drinking sake while Himeno balanced the budget and cooked their meals. He stopped writing due to Himeno's mother's death. In the anime adaptation, he is shown turning to sculpture after his marriage to Natsue. He is voiced by Yuji Ueda in the original Japanese dub, and by Jason Douglas in the English dub.

  is a wealthy and powerful executive who married her teenage crush Kaoru Awayuki after her divorce. She only exposes her soft-side to Kaoru while dealing with everyone else with a strict decorum. Her daughters are named after characters in her favorite book by Kaoru, Twin Princesses. Natsue is consumed by jealousy of her husband's late former wife and of Himeno, treating the girl more harshly than her own daughters. Her hatred results in her being possessed by the Princess of Disaster. In the anime, Natsue is never possessed by the Princess of disaster, she didn't divorce her husband, but instead he passed away, she never shows any jealousy about Kaoru's late wife, and while strict with Himeno, also cares about her wellbeing. She is voiced by Kikuko Inoue in the Japanese dub track, and by Lauren Goodnight in the English dub.

Leafe Knights
  is the Knight of Wind. Hayate is initially hostile towards Himeno, refusing to acknowledge her as the new Prétear due to a past experience, but gradually begins to accept her as the Prétear impressed by her strong will and determination. Hayate soon begins to develop feelings for Himeno and eventually falls in love with her, going to so far to protect her as to gain a job at her estate working for her father. In the anime adaptation, he is voiced by Kousuke Toriumi in the original Japanese dub, and by Illich Guardiola in the English dub.

  is the Knight of Sound and has a job as a radio personality, addressing people's problems on the air. He is a reported flirt, with the other knights referring to him as a playboy, but he also is a good listener and offers himself as a sounding board to Himeno. In the manga, he remains a knight of leafe and appears to fall for Himeno. In the anime, he later becomes Fenrir's Knight of Darkness after confessing that he was in love with Takako 16 years ago, pitting him against the Leafe Knights and the Prétear. In the anime adaptation, his personality is changed to a quieter, more serious nature, and he is given an older appearance. He is voiced by Takahiro Sakurai in the original Japanese dub, and by Chris Patton in the English dub.

  is the Knight of Light and works at an Internet company. Kei is the most practical and direct of the Knights, which sometimes leads to confrontation. In the anime, Kei is changed to be a narcissist, as illustrated by the numerous self-depicting toys and pictures in his work. In the Japanese dub, he is voiced by Makoto Naruse and by Victor Carsrud in the English dub.

  is the Knight of Fire and works as a waiter in his part time job. In the anime adaptation, he is voiced by Shotaro Morikubo in the Japanese dub, and by Spike Spencer in the English dub.

  is the Knight of Ice and is the unstated leader of the younger members of the Leafe Knights. With his two followers, Hajime and Shin, the last Mannen died while fighting the Princess of Disaster sixteen years ago and was reborn as a child. Akiko Yajima voices Mannen in the Japanese dub track of the anime adaptation, and by Greg Ayres in the English dub.

  is the Knight of Water and is the second youngest member of the Leafe Knights. In the Japanese dub of the anime adaptation, he is voiced by Misato Fukuen and Hilary Haag provides his voice in the English dub.

  is the youngest member of the Leafe Knights and the Knight of Plants. He can use his abilities to heal plants, and is very sensitive to anyone hurting them, crying when the knights discuss killing a tree that has been infected by a demon larva. Like the other two younger Knights, Shin died sixteen years ago while fighting the Princess of Disaster and was reborn. In the manga, when he prete's with Himeno he dies as the Prétear must draw energy from the knight to fight, but is revived. In the anime, the use of a knight's leafe is removed, and Shin is the only knight never shown preting with her. He is also given the additional abilities to seal demon larvae and to create a barrier around a battle to keep the environment from being harmed by battles with the larvae. In the anime adaptation, Tamaki Nakanishi voices Shin in the Japanese dub, and Sasha Paysinger provides his voice in the English dub.

Other characters
  is the Awayuki's butler/chauffeur. He and Natsue used to go to school together, with Mr. Tanaka harboring a crush on Natsue while she pursued other interests. He once offered Natsue a ride, which led to his employment as the Awayuki's chauffeur. In the anime adaptation, he is voiced by Takehito Koyasu and in the English dub, he is voiced by Paul Sidello.

  is Himeno's friend from middle school and her schoolmate, having transferred to Himeno's school with her. In the anime adaptation, their earlier friendship is never mentioned, and its implied they became friends at school after Yayoi ignores bullies telling her to stay away from Himeno. Her personality is also changed into that of a hopeless romantic who spins outrageous scenarios about the pursuit of love. In the original Japanese audio track, she is voiced by Yukari Tamura. In the English dub, she is voiced by Monica Rial.

She fell in love with Hayate, but he was unable to reciprocate her feelings, causing her to turn her powers towards evil. As Fenrir, Takako's ultimate goal is to destroy the world by taking away the Leafe that preserves all life. In the anime adaptation, Sasame confesses that he had loved her all along. She doesn't return his feelings but has him become her Knight of Darkness and orders him to kill Hayate and attack the other Leafe Knights. At the end of the series, after Sasame's death, Takako realizes that she loves him, and Himeno's kindness and Sasame's death out of love for her enables her to regain her humanity and return to normal. She is last seen with the revived Sasame, both now a couple. Takako assumes the form of a maid at the Awayuki estate named  who is friendly with Himeno and company and regularly provides advice to Himeno and Mawata. In the anime adaptation, Yui Horie provides her voice in the Japanese dub and Kaytha Coker voices her in the English dub.

Demons
Forces of darkness eventually controlled by Fenrir that seek to drain the Leafe out of all other life forms similar to parasites. Although this is instantaneous toward plant life, more complicated organisms such as animals take over the course of hours to drain entirely.

Demon Larvae: Appear throughout the series starting in episode 1. Powers include environmental merging, tentacles, and size growth.
Water Demon: Appears in episodes 1 and 2. Powers include a water based body and tentacles from the body.
Trash Demon: Appears in episode 2. Powers include a pair of heads and a thick turtle shell.
Bicycle Demon: Appears in episode 3. Powers include body tentacles and controlling detached body parts.
Soil Demon: Appears in episode 4. Powers include tentacles and high jumping.
Transport Demons: Appear throughout the series starting in episode 5. Powers include flight and a toothy mouth tentacle. In episode 11 one was capable of growing to the size of a fully grown human adult.
Electric Demon: Appears in episode 5. Powers include tentacles and conducting electricity with its head bulb.
Building Demon: Appears in episodes 6, 7, and 8. Powers include impaling tentacles, phasing through matter, burrowing, spawning decoys, and a purple energy beam from its top.
Great Tree of Fenrir: Appears in episodes 11, 12, and 13. Powers include large destructive vines, size growth, regeneration, and spawning demon larvae.

Production
Anime director Junichi Satou created Prétear out of his desire to work on a series for women that featured good-looking boys. Wanting to base the story on a fairy tale, he asked himself what Snow White and the Seven Dwarfs would be like if the dwarfs were replaced with cute guys. As the story took shape, Leafe became the symbol of the apple in the story. It can pass on its life force to others, like a regular apple when eaten, or take away life as the poison apple did in the original story. Feeling that the concept of a woman being rescued by "Prince Charming" was old-fashioned and not fitting with modern girls, he decided to make Prétear'''s "Snow White", Himeno, a more assertive woman.

Though an anime director himself, Satou did not the direct the anime adaptation of Prétear. Kiyoko Sayama directed the series, while Satou provided consultation and checked the scripts and storyboards before they were animated. The anime characters were designed by Akemi Kobayashi, who made changes to the characters for the new story. For example, Hayate's anime version has longer hair tied in a ponytail, while in the manga story, Hayate had cut off his longer hair before the start. The design of Kei is the most drastically changed in the adaptation, with the anime version bearing little resemblance to his manga original.

Media

Manga
Written by Junichi Satou and illustrated by Kaori Naruse, the four volume Prétear'' manga series was published in Japan by Kadokawa Shoten. The first volume was released on June 1, 2000, and the final was released on July 21, 2001. All four volumes have been published in English in North America by ADV Manga.

Volume list

Anime
Hal Film Maker, Kadokawa Shoten, and Rondo Robe collaborated to adapt the manga chapters into an anime series that premiered in Japan on WOWOW on April 4, 2001. It ran for 13 episodes until its conclusion on June 27, 2001. Geneon (now NBCUniversal Entertainment Japan) released the series episodes across four volumes in Japan in both VHS video and DVD forms. ADV Films licensed and released the anime series. Funimation has re-licensed the series.

The series uses two pieces of theme music. The song "White Destiny", performed by Yoko Ishida, is used for the series opening theme. "Lucky Star", sung by Sayuri Yoshida, is used for its ending theme.

Episode list

References

External links
 Official Geneon Pretear website 
 Official Funimation Site 
 

2001 anime television series debuts
ADV Films
Anime and manga based on fairy tales
Male harem anime and manga
Magical girl anime and manga
Films about reincarnation
Funimation
Hal Film Maker
Kadokawa Shoten manga
NBCUniversal Entertainment Japan
Odex
Romance anime and manga
Works based on Snow White
Wowow original programming
Magical boy